The Perry Lakes Reserve is a nature reserve located approximately  west of , the capital city of Western Australia, in the suburb of .

In its current form, the reserve dates from 1962 when the area was landscaped in association with the construction of Perry Lakes Stadium and associated sporting tracks and facilities for the 1962 British Empire and Commonwealth Games. The Australian Scout Jamboree has been held in the parkland twice, during the summers of 1979/80 and 1994/95. The sporting complex was demolished in 2011 to make way for housing development.

See also

 List of lakes of Western Australia

References

Lakes of Perth, Western Australia
Nature reserves in Western Australia
Town of Cambridge
Floreat, Western Australia